Vasey oak may refer to:

 Quercus vaseyana
 Quercus pungens